The Air Accidents Investigation Branch (AAIB) investigates civil aircraft accidents and serious incidents within the United Kingdom, its overseas territories and crown dependencies. It is also the Space Accident Investigation Authority (SAIA) for the United Kingdom. The AAIB is a branch of the Department for Transport and is based in the grounds of Farnborough Airport, Hampshire.

History
Aviation accident investigation in the United Kingdom started in 1912, when the Royal Aero Club published a report into a fatal accident at Brooklands Aerodrome, Surrey.

The AAIB was established in 1915 as the Accidents Investigation Branch (AIB) of the Royal Flying Corps (RFC). 
Captain G B Cockburn was appointed "Inspector of Accidents" for the RFC, reporting directly to the Director General of Military Aeronautics in the War Office.

After the First World War, the Department of Civil Aviation was set up in the Air Ministry and the AIB became part of that department with a remit to investigate both civil and military aviation accidents.

Following the Second World War a Ministry of Civil Aviation was established and in 1946 the AIB was transferred to it, but continued to assist the Royal Air Force with accident investigations - a situation which has continued ever since.

After working under various parent ministries, including the Department of Trade, the AIB moved to the then Department of Transport in 1983 and in November 1987 its name was changed to the Air Accidents Investigation Branch (AAIB). Latterly, the AAIB has become part of the reorganised Department for Transport (DfT) since 2002.

Organization
The AAIB has 64 employees.

These are:
Chief Inspector of Air Accidents
Deputy Chief Inspector of Air Accidents
Six teams of inspectors from all disciplines each led by a principal inspector

AAIB Inspectors fall into one of three categories:

Operations inspector – must hold a current Airline Transport Pilot Licence with a valid Class I medical certificate. Able to offer appropriate command experience on fixed-wing aircraft or helicopters. Broad-based knowledge of aviation.
Engineering inspector – must hold an engineering degree and/or be a Chartered Engineer with a minimum of five years' post qualifications experience. Knowledge and experience of modern aircraft control systems.
Flight recorder inspector – degree level in electronics/electrical engineering or an aeronautical engineering related subject and/or is a chartered member of a relevant engineering institute with eight years' experience since qualifying. Knowledge and experience of modern avionics.

There is also a Head of Administration who is supported by two teams, the Inspector Support Unit (ISU) who provide administrative support to the principal inspectors and their teams and the Information Unit (IU), who are the first port of call for accidents being reported.

AAIB administrative staff are part of the Department for Transport (DfT) and are recruited according to civil service guidelines.

Space Accident Investigation Authority
In 2021, it was announced that the AAIB had been appointed as the Space Accident Investigation Authority for the United Kingdom, in accordance with the Spaceflight Activities (Investigation of Spaceflight Accidents) Regulations 2021. Independent of the UK Space Agency, it will investigate spaceflight accidents that occur in or over the United Kingdom.

Investigations
The AAIB conducts investigations defined under one of two categories; "Accident" or "Serious Incident". An "Accident" occurs where a person suffers a fatal or serious injury, the aircraft sustains damage or structural failure which adversely affects its performance, or where the aircraft is missing or inaccessible. A "Serious Incident" means an incident where an accident nearly occurred.

The AAIB is responsible for the investigation of civil aircraft accidents and serious incidents within the UK and its overseas territories. These are Anguilla, Bermuda, the British Virgin Islands, Cayman Islands, Gibraltar, the Falkland Islands, Montserrat and the Turks and Caicos Islands.

They are also involved in overseas investigations in other countries when the accident or incident involves a British-registered or British-built aircraft or UK airline, or where their involvement is specifically requested by the investigating host nation.

Head office

The Air Accidents Investigation Branch has its head office in Farnborough House, a building that is a part of a compound within the boundary of Farnborough Airport, located between Aldershot and Farnborough, within the borough of Rushmoor. The approximately  head office site, which houses three large buildings and car park facilities, is in a lightly wooded area south of the main runway of Farnborough Airport. The buildings at the AAIB site include an  L-shaped, two-storey flat roof office building and a hangar. The original buildings were from the 1970s. Lana Design supervised the construction of a  two-storey new addition to the main building. It includes offices, acoustic laboratories and a lecture theatre. The addition had a cost of 2.6 million pounds.

The AAIB site is south of the airfield and east of the Puckeridge Ammunition Depot, and it is located near the Basingstoke Canal. The AAIB head office is accessible from Berkshire Copse Road, which dissects through the length of the AAIB head office site. The Borough of Rushmoor stated that the AAIB complex "requires a secluded" and "secure" location due to "the nature of its operation."

Previously the AAIB head office was in Shell Mex House on the Strand in the City of Westminster, London.

See also

Other United Kingdom accident investigation bodies
 Marine Accident Investigation Branch
 Rail Accident Investigation Branch
 Road Safety Investigation Branch
 Aviation safety
 List of accidents and incidents involving military aircraft
 List of accidents and incidents involving airliners in the United Kingdom
 Air Accident Investigation Unit - Ireland
 National Transportation Safety Board – United States
 Transportation Safety Board of Canada - Canada
 International Board for Research into Air Crash Events

References

External links 

 
 "Accident Investigation" a 1951 Flight article
 "Accident Investigation" a 1985 Flight article
 "A Matter of Judgement" a 1987 Flight article

Aviation authorities
Aviation organisations based in the United Kingdom
Aviation safety in the United Kingdom
1915 establishments in England
Department for Transport
Farnborough, Hampshire
Government agencies established in 1915
Organisations based in Hampshire
United Kingdom
Public bodies and task forces of the United Kingdom government
Space agencies